The Antiquities Coalition (AC) is a non-governmental organization working to stop the looting and trafficking of antiquities. It is headquartered in Washington, D.C.

The AC was founded in the aftermath of the Egyptian Revolution in January 2011, when, in the weeks after the uprising, reports of cultural racketeering lit up archaeological hotlines due to the plundering of ancient sites, museums, storerooms, and places of worship.

This looting crisis inspired the creation of the International Coalition to Protect Egyptian Antiquities (ICPEA), which developed a public-private partnership with the Egyptian Ministry of Antiquities: the first of its kind.  The AC was founded in 2014 in order to host other initiatives similar to the ICPEA, and expand its model to other countries in times of crisis.

Projects 
The Antiquities Coalition is leading the global campaign against cultural racketeering: the looting and trafficking of ancient art. This illicit industry is financing organized crime, armed conflict, and violent extremism around the world.  It is erasing our past—and threatening our future. The Antiquities Coalition partners with leaders from the public and private sectors, tackles plunder-for-profit head on. Through independent research and outside collaborations, we develop and implement innovative and practical solutions, empowering communities and even countries in crisis.

AC works with experts to analyze the illegal antiquities trade, which the Congressional Research Service has named as a major source of funding for the Islamic State of Iraq and the Levant. AC also builds archeological databases, and organizes conferences and roundtables, sometimes with Middle East officials responsible for the antiquities trade. In May 2015, the Antiquities Coalition organized the Culture Under Threat Conference in Cairo on the theft of antiquities.

In June 2020, After pressure from many groups, including the Antiquities Coalition, Facebook announced new rules that would ban the exchange, sale, and purchase of all "historical artifacts" on its site and on Instagram.

See also
 Antiquities
 Antiquities trade
 Looted art
 Archaeological looting in Iraq
 Ancient art
 Islamic State of Iraq and the Levant

References

External links
 The Antiquities Coalition

Charities based in Washington, D.C.
Cultural organizations based in Washington, D.C.
Organizations established in 2011
Archaeological theft
Egypt–United States relations